Agosta may refer to:

Agosta, Lazio, a commune in the Province of Rome, Italy
, a French-built class of diesel-electric attack submarines
, more than one submarine of the French Navy
Matteo Agosta (1922–1964), Italian politician